Jamia Ahmadiyya Sunnia Kamil Madrasah, popularly known as the Jamia Ahmadiyya is prominent higher educational institution in Sholashahar, Chandgaon, Chittagong, Bangladesh. Established in 1954, it is one of the largest and oldest Sunni Barelvi Madrasah in Bangladesh. Renowned Islamic scholar, Syed Ahmad Shah Sirikoti was its founder. It was established on the basis of doctrine of Imam  Ahmed Raza Khan. Syed Muhammad Tayyab Shah was the patron of the institution. Now Syed Muhammad Taher Shah and Syed Muhammad Sabir Shah are patron of the institution.

Degrees and courses
Following courses are taught.

Primary level – Urdu; Persian; Arabic; Nahu-Sarf; Sirat-un-Nabi; Fiqh etc. are taught along with the mathematics; history; Bengali; English and geography.
 Secondary level – higher Arabic grammar; Arabic literature; Fiqh; logic.
 Higher secondary level – higher Fiqh and Usul-e-Fiqh; higher logic; higher Arabic literature; higher economics; higher philosophy; higher Islam history.
 Graduate level – Hadith; Tafsir; Arabic and Persian poetry; solar science.
 Post graduate level – six major Hadith Books: Bukhari Sharif, Muslim Sharif, Abu Dawd Sharif, Tirmidi Sharif, Nasaee Sharif and Ibn Majah are mainly taught.
 Beyond post graduate level – further study in the field of Islamic law; Arabic language and literature; higher Hadith study, Bengali literature and Islamic studies.

Administration
It is under Anjuman-E-Rahmania Ahmadia Sunnia Trust which is running at least hundred Madarsahs of Sunni Barelvi ideology in the Bangladesh.

See also
 Jamia Nizamia
 Jamiatur Raza
 Islam in India
 Al-Jame-atul-Islamia
 Manzar-e-Islam

References

External links
 Official website
 Map

Islamic universities and colleges in Bangladesh
Madrasas in Bangladesh
Alia madrasas of Bangladesh
Barelvi Islamic universities and colleges